This is a list of junior high schools in Okinawa Prefecture.

National

Municipal

Okinawa Island

Naha

 Ishida (石田中学校)
 Ishimine (石嶺中学校)
 Jouhoku (城北中学校) - Includes a branch school
 Kagamihara (鏡原中学校)
 Kamihara (神原中学校)
 Kanagusuku (金城中学校)
 Kokura (古蔵中学校)
 Matsushima (松島中学校)
 Matsushiro (松城中学校)
 Mawashi (真和志中学校)
 Naha (那覇中学校)
 Nakaima (仲井真中学校)
 Oroku (小禄中学校)
 Shuri (首里中学校)
 Uenoyama (上山中学校)
 Yasuoka (安岡中学校)
 Yorimiya (寄宮中学校)

Chatan
Chatan Junior High School (北谷中学校)
 (桑江中学校).

Ginoza
Ginoza Junior High School (宜野座中学校)

Haebaru

 Haebaru Junior High School (南風原中学校)
 Nansei Junior High School (南星中学校)

Higashi
 Higashi Combined Kindergarten, Elementary, and Junior High School (東幼小中学校)

Kadena
 Kadena Junior High School (嘉手納中学校)

Kin
 Kin Junior High School (金武中学校)

Kitanakagusuku
 Kitanakagusuku Junior High School

Kunigami
 Kunigami Junior High School (国頭中学校).

Motobu

 Izumi Elementary and Junior High School (伊豆味小中学校)
 Kamimotobu Gakuen (上本部学園) - Kamimotobu Junior High School (上本部中学校)
 Minna Elementary and Junior High School (水納小中学校)
 Motobu Junior High School (本部中学校)

Note:
 Sesoko Elementary School (瀬底小学校) was formerly Sesoko Elementary and Junior High School (瀬底小中学校)

Nakagusuku

 Nakagusuku Junior High School (中城中学校)

Nakijin
 Nakijin Junior High School (今帰仁中学校)

Nishihara

 Nishihara Junior High School (西原中学校)

Ogimi
 Ogimi Junior High (大宜味中学校)

Other islands

 Aguni
 

 Ie
 Ie Junior High School (伊江中学校)

 Iheya
 Iheya Junior High School (伊平屋中学校)

 Kitadaito
 Kitadaito Village Kitadaito Elementary-Junior High School (北大東村立北大東小中学校 Kitadaitō Sonritsu Kitadaitō Shōchūgakkō).

 Kumejima
 Kumejima Nishi Junior High School (久米島西中学校)
 Kumi Junior High School (球美中学校)

 Minamidaito
 Minamidaito Elementary and Junior High School (南大東村立南大東小中学校)

 Tarama
 Tarama Junior High School (多良間中学校)

Foreign government-operated
Department of Defense Education Activity (DoDEA), United States:
 Kadena Middle School - Kadena Air Force Base
 Lester Middle School - Camp Lester
 Ryukyu Middle School - Kadena Air Force Base

References

Okinawa Prefecture
Education in Okinawa Prefecture